Main Automotive-Armoured Directorate of the Ministry of Defence of the Russian Federation (abbr. GABTU; another translation: Main Directorate of Armoured Forces) is a department of the Russian Ministry of Defence which is subordinated to the Chief of Armaments and Munitions of the Armed Forces, vice-minister of defense. Its director appears to currently be General Major Vladislav Polonskiy, as identified by Krasnaya Zvezda on September 14, 2004.

Object numbers

These names are sometimes referred to incorrectly as "industry designation" or "factory names".

The initial digit corresponds to the design bureau.
1-99 Gorky Automobile Factory (GAZ) 
100-199 Ural Railway Car Building Factory (Uralvagonzavod plant №183)
201-299 Leningrad Kirov Plant (LKZ)
300-349 Ural Plant of Transport Engineering (UZTM)
400-499 Malyshev Factory (HZTM)
500 Omsktransmash (plant №174)
501-549 Rubtsovsk Engineering Works 
550-599 Mytishchi Machine Building Factory (MMZ)
600-699 Kurgan Engineering Factory (KMZ)
700-799 Chelyabinsk Kirov (Tractor) Plant (ChKZ, ChTZ)
800-849 Various
850-899 Moscow Automobile Factory (ZIS, ZIL)
900-999 Stalingrad (Volgograd) Tractor Factory (STZ, VgTZ)
1000-1050 Kutaisi Automotive Factory (KAZ)

List

See also 
 GRAU
 List of Soviet tank factories

References

External links 
 Chief of Armament and Munition of the Armed Forces (Russian)
 History of GABTU (Russian)

Ministry of Defence (Russia)
Military of the Soviet Union
Soviet Army